Jimmy Cha (Korean: 차민수, Hanja: 車敏洙, born January 15, 1951), also known as Ch'a Min-su, is a South Korean professional go and avid poker player. He is also a black belt in martial arts and a talented classical pianist.

Jimmy was born in Seoul, and grew up playing go and poker. He turned professional in 1974 and was the best player at Dongguk University when he attended. Along with these accolades, he was also the South Korean National Amateur Champion two times in a row.

The Hanguk Kiwon awarded him four dan for spreading go around the world in 1984, after he moved to the U.S. in 1975. As of 2021, he is 6 dan.

Cha has a nickname, "eternal Mr. Quarter-Finalist", because in many professional tournaments he would usually lose in the quarterfinals. In 1989, he beat Yamashiro Hiroshi and Ohira Shuzo to advance to the quarterfinals of the Fujitsu Cup, only to lose. The next year, he made it to the quarterfinals of the Fujitsu Cup again after beating Cho Chikun. In March 2008, he defeated Imamura Toshiya 9P in the Chunlan Cup.

Today, he splits his time between go, poker, and managing businesses.

Runner-Up titles

References

Articles on Jimmy Cha in the 'Go World (1)'

(nn: mm-oo, pp means: issue nn, pages mm-oo and pp)

China-Korea match in California 1985 (report)   41: 6-11, 33
"Go in Korea"   37: 20-22*
"Jimmy Cha: Giant Killer" (Wood)   55: 11-17*
Kukgi Title Match 1984 (report)   38: 36-39*
U.S. professionals, wins first match (1988) between   52: 4

Cha, Jimmy vs. Cho Chikun
Fujitsu Cup 1990 (Round 2)   60: 13-16*

Cha, Jimmy vs. Cho Hun-hyeon
Fujitsu Cup 1989 (quarterfinal)   56: 10-13*

Cha, Jimmy vs. Nie Weiping
Fujitsu Cup 1990 (quarterfinal)   61: 12-15*

Cha, Jimmy vs. Ohira Shuzo
Fujitsu Cup 1989 (Round 2)   55: 15-17*

Cha, Jimmy vs. Redmond, Michael
1984   38: 34-35

Cha, Jimmy vs. Yamashiro Hiroshi
Fujitsu Cup 1989 (Round 1)   55: 12-15*

(1) sources: magazine itself: Go World,  covers of Go World's publisher Kiseido , Go World index

External links
 Hendon Mob poker tournament results
 Biography, results in Go tournaments and poker tournaments
 Korea Baduk Association profile (in Korean)

1951 births
Living people
American Go players
American poker players
South Korean Go players
South Korean poker players
South Korean emigrants to the United States